The Night at Goldenhall is a 1920 German silent film directed by and starring Conrad Veidt. It is now considered a lost film.

The film's sets were designed by the art director Robert Neppach.

Cast
 Conrad Veidt as Lord Reginald Golden / Harald Golden
 Gussy Holl as Ellen Lehden
 Esther Hagan as Rajah
 Heinrich Peer as Baron Lehden

References

Bibliography
 John T. Soister. Conrad Veidt on Screen: A Comprehensive Illustrated Filmography. McFarland, 2002.

External links

1920 films
Films of the Weimar Republic
German silent feature films
Films directed by Conrad Veidt
German black-and-white films
Lost German films
1920s German films